Eureka Atchison, Topeka and Santa Fe Railroad Depot is a historic building at 416 E. 5th Street in Eureka, Kansas. The depot is on the Howard Branch of the Atchison, Topeka and Santa Fe Railway.  It was built to replace an earlier 1879 depot, located just to the north.  Completed in 1917 at a cost of $20,000, the depot was part of a building boom in the area caused by the discovery of oil in Butler and Greenwood counties.

Passenger service on the Howard Branch ended in the mid 1950s, the depot closed in 1971.

References

Buildings and structures in Greenwood County, Kansas
Railway stations on the National Register of Historic Places in Kansas
Atchison, Topeka and Santa Fe Railway stations
Railway stations in the United States opened in 1917
Railway stations closed in 1971
National Register of Historic Places in Greenwood County, Kansas
Eureka, Kansas
Former railway stations in Kansas
1917 establishments in Kansas